Arlene Blencowe (born 11 April 1983) is a mixed martial artist and boxer, currently competing in the Women's Featherweight division of Bellator MMA, where she is the first Australian female fighter in the promotion's history. As of June 28, 2022, she is #5 in the Bellator Women's pound-for-pound Rankings and #2 in the Bellator Women's Featherweight Rankings.

Boxing career
Blencowe began her boxing career in 2012 in her native Australia. She has world championships in World Boxing Federation and Women’s International Boxing Association.  She has a current record of 4 wins and 4 losses.

Mixed martial arts career

Early career
Blencowe began her professional MMA career a year after she began boxing in April 2013. Fighting exclusively in her native Australia, she amassed a record of 5 wins and 4 losses over the first year and a half of her career.

Bellator MMA
On 27 October 2014 it was announced that Blencowe had signed with Bellator MMA.

Blencowe made her Bellator debut against Adrienna Jenkins on 15 May 2015 at Bellator 137. She won the fight via TKO in the first round.

In her second fight for the promotion, Blencowe faced Marloes Coenen on 28 August 2015 at Bellator 141. She lost the fight via armbar submission in the second round.

In her third fight for the promotion, Blencowe faced Gabby Holloway on 20 November 2015 at Bellator 146. She won the fight via split decision.

In her fourth fight for the promotion, Blencowe faced Julia Budd on 21 October 2016 at Bellator 162. She lost the bout via majority decision.

After picking up two wins outside of Bellator, Blencowe returned to face Sinead Kavanagh on 25 August 2017 at Bellator 182. She won the fight via split decision.

Blencowe fought for the Bellator Women's Featherweight Championship against Julia Budd in a rematch on 1 December 2017 at Bellator 189. She lost the fight by split decision.

Blencowe faced Amber Leibrock on 29 September 2018 at Bellator at Bellator 206. She won the fight via technical knockout in the third round.

Racking up three straight victories, Blencowe next challenged Cris Cyborg for the Bellator Women's Featherweight World Championship at Bellator 249 on 15 October 2020. She lost the bout via second round submission.

In December 2020, Blencowe signed a new multi-fight contract with Bellator.

Blencowe faced Dayana Silva on July 16, 2021 at Bellator 262. She won the bout via TKO in the third round.

Blencowe faced Pam Sorenson on November 12, 2021 at Bellator 271. She won the bout via unanimous decision.

Blencowe rematched Cris Cyborg for the Bellator Women's Featherweight World Championship on April 23, 2022 at Bellator 279. She lost the bout via unanimous decision.

Blencowe is scheduled to face Sara McMann on April 21, 2023 at Bellator 294.

Championships and accomplishments
Bellator MMA
Most fights in Bellator Women's Featherweight division history (12)
Most knockout wins in Bellator Women's Featherweight division history (four)
Most stoppage wins in Bellator Women's Featherweight division history (four)

Boxing record

|-
| Align="center" colspan=8|4 Wins (2 TKOs, 2 decisions), 4 Losses (4 decisions), 0 Draws
|- style="font-size: 85%; text-align: left;" class="wikitable sortable" width="100%"
|-
!style="border-style: none none solid solid; background: #e3e3e3"|Result
!style="border-style: none none solid solid; background: #e3e3e3"|Record
!style="border-style: none none solid solid; background: #e3e3e3"|Opponent
!style="border-style: none none solid solid; background: #e3e3e3"|Type
!style="border-style: none none solid solid; background: #e3e3e3"|Rd, Time
!style="border-style: none none solid solid; background: #e3e3e3"|Date
!style="border-style: none none solid solid; background: #e3e3e3"|Location
!style="border-style: none none solid solid; background: #e3e3e3"|Notes
|-
| Win
| 4–4–0
|  Kewarin Boonme
| Referee's Technical Decision
| 
| 2015-12-12
| Align=left| Sydney, Australia
|
|-
| Win
| 3–4–0
|  Samon Khunurat
| TKO
| 
| 2015-10-03
| Align=left| Sydney, Australia
| 
|-
| Loss
| 2–4–0
|  Erin McGowan
| Unanimous Decision
| 10
| 2014-11-21
| Align=left| Perth, Australia
| For vacant Women's International Boxing Association World Lightweight Title 
|-
| Loss
| 2–3–0
|  Tori Nelson
| Split Decision
| 10
| 2014-09-27
| Align=left| Springfield, Virginia, United States
| Fought for WIBA Women's International Boxing Association World welterweight title
|-
| Loss
| 2–2–0
|  Sabrina Ostowari
| Unanimous Decision
| 8
| 2014-02-14
| Align=left| Queensland, Australia
|Fought for the vacant Australia female lightweight title
|-
| Win
| 2–1–0
|  Daniella Smith
| Unanimous Decision
| 10 
| 2013-06-13
| Align=left| Auckland, New Zealand
| Fought for vacant WIBA Women's International Boxing Association World light welterweight title 
Fought for vacant World Boxing Federation female welterweight title
|-
| Loss
| 1–1–0
|  Sarah Howett
| Decision
| 6
| 2012-10-20
| Align=left| Victoria, Australia
|
|-
| Win
| 1–0–0
|  Nadine Brown
| Decision
| 6 
| 2012-07-08
| Align=left| Queensland
| Professional debut

Mixed martial arts record

|-
| Loss
| align=center| 15–9
| Cris Cyborg
| Decision (unanimous)
| Bellator 279
| 
| align=center|5
| align=center|5:00
| Honolulu, Hawaii, United States
|
|-
| Win
| align=center| 15–8
| Pam Sorenson
| Decision (unanimous)
| Bellator 271
| 
| align=center| 3
| align=center| 5:00
| Hollywood, Florida, United States
|
|-
|Win
|align=center|14–8
|Dayana Silva
|TKO (punches)
|Bellator 262
|
|align=center|3
|align=center|1:00
|Uncasville, Connecticut, United States
|
|-
| Loss
| align=center| 13–8
| Cris Cyborg
| Submission (rear-naked choke)
| Bellator 249
| 
| align=center| 2
| align=center| 2:36
| Uncasville, Connecticut, United States
| 
|-
| Win
| align=center| 13–7
| Leslie Smith
| Decision (unanimous)
| Bellator 233
| 
| align=center| 3
| align=center| 5:00
| Thackerville, Oklahoma, United States
|
|-
| Win
| align=center| 12–7
| Amanda Bell
| KO (punches)
| Bellator 224
| 
| align=center| 1
| align=center| 0:22
| Thackerville, Oklahoma, United States
|
|-
| Win
| align=center| 11–7
| Amber Leibrock
| TKO (slam and punches)
| Bellator 206
| 
| align=center| 3
| align=center| 1:23
| San Jose, California, United States
|
|-
| Loss
| align=center| 10–7
| Julia Budd
| Decision (split)
| Bellator 189
| 
| align=center| 5
| align=center| 5:00
| Thackerville, Oklahoma, United States
|
|-
|Win
|align=center|10–6
|Sinead Kavanagh
|Decision (split)
|Bellator 182
|
|align=center|3
|align=center|5:00
|Verona, New York, United States
|
|-
|Win
|align=center|9–6
|Rhiannon Thompson
|TKO
|Australian FC 18: Night 2
|
|align=center|1
|align=center|1
|Gold Coast, Australia
|
|-
|Win
|align=center|8–6
|Janay Harding
|TKO (punches)
|Legend MMA 1
|
|align=center|1
|align=center|1:08
|Gold Coast, Australia
|
|-
| Loss
| align=center|7–6
| Julia Budd
| Decision (majority)
| Bellator 162
| 
| align=center| 3
| align=center| 5:00
| Memphis, Tennessee, United States
|
|-
| Win
| align=center|7–5 
| Gabby Holloway
| Decision (split)
| Bellator 146
| 
| align=center| 3
| align=center| 5:00
| Thackerville, Oklahoma, United States
|
|-
| Loss
| align=center|6–5 
| Marloes Coenen
| Submission (armbar)
| Bellator 141
| 
| align=center| 2
| align=center| 3:23
| Temecula, California, United States
|
|-
|Win
|align=center|6–4
|Adrienna Jenkins
|TKO (punches)
|Bellator 137
|
|align=center|1
|align=center|4:08
|Temecula, California, United States
|
|-
|Win
|align=center|5–4
|Faith Van Duin
|KO (knee to the body)
|Storm MMA - Storm Damage 5
|
|align=center|3
|align=center|3:00
|Queensland, Australia
|
|-
|Win
|align=center|4–4
|Kenani Mangakahia
|Submission (triangle choke)
|FightWorld Cup 17
|
|align=center|1
|align=center|4:21
|Adelaide, Australia
|
|-
|Win
|align=center|3–4
|Mae-Lin Leow
|TKO (punches)
|MMA Down Under 4
|
|align=center|1
|align=center|4:21
|Adelaide, Australia
|
|-
|Loss
|align=center|2–4
|Faith Van Duin
|Decision (split)
|Storm MMA - Storm Damage 3
|
|align=center|3
|align=center|3:00
|Canberra, Australia
|
|-
|Win
|align=center|2–3
|Maryanne Mullahy
|Decision (unanimous)
|Storm MMA - Storm Damage 3
|
|align=center|3
|align=center|5:00
|Canberra, Australia
|
|-
|Loss
|align=center|1–3
|Kate Da Silva
|Submission (rear-naked choke)
|Storm MMA - Storm Damage 3
|
|align=center|2
|align=center|3:00
|Canberra, Australia
|
|-
|Loss
|align=center|1–2
|Jessica-Rose Clark
|Submission (rear-naked choke)
|Nitro MMA - Nitro 9
|
|align=center|2
|align=center|3:38
|Queensland, Australia
|
|-
|Win
|align=center|1–1
|Kerry Barrett
|Decision (split)
|Brace For War 20
|
|align=center|5
|align=center|5:00
|Queensland, Australia
|
|-
|Loss
|align=center|0–1
|Kyra Purcell
|Submission (armbar)
|FightWorld Cup 14
|
|align=center|2
|align=center|1:27
|Queensland, Australia
|

See also
 List of female boxers
 List of female mixed martial artists

References

External links
 
 
 
 Arlene Blencowe at Awakening Fighters
 Arlene Blencowe Documentary at Flying Machine Films
 
 
 

1983 births
Living people
Sportswomen from New South Wales
Australian female mixed martial artists
Australian women boxers
Boxers from Sydney
Lightweight mixed martial artists
Featherweight mixed martial artists
Mixed martial artists utilizing boxing
Mixed martial artists utilizing kickboxing
World boxing champions
World welterweight boxing champions
Welterweight boxers
Lightweight boxers
Bellator female fighters
Australian people of Filipino descent
Australian sportspeople of Asian descent
Sportspeople of Filipino descent